SS St. Cergue was a Swiss cargo ship, originally the British merchant ship Felldene. She served in the Merchant Marine of Switzerland during the Second World War, notably rescuing survivors of several ships sunk by submarines.

Career

Construction and early career

Second World War 
In June 1941, she gave passage from Schiedam to New York City to the Dutch Resistance fighters Peter Tazelaar, Bram van der Stok and Erik Hazelhoff Roelfzema.

In late September  1943, St. Cergue rescued the Portuguese steamer , victim of an accidental fire, and managed to tow her to Recife.

The 1977 film Soldier of Orange features St. Cergue, played by the French tanker Esso Port Jérôme, modified for the occasion.

Notes and references

References

Sources 

1937 ships
Steamships of Switzerland
Merchant ships of Switzerland
Steamships of the United Kingdom
Merchant ships of the United Kingdom
Steamships of West Germany
Merchant ships of West Germany